Karen Margaret McPherson (born 1966) is a Canadian politician who was elected in the 2015 Alberta general election to the Legislative Assembly of Alberta representing the electoral district of Calgary-Mackay-Nose Hill with a plurality of votes under the first-past-the-post system.
On October 4, 2017, McPherson announced she was leaving the NDP to sit as an Independent. Weeks later, she announced that she was joining the caucus of the Alberta Party, becoming its second MLA.

In March 2019 she announced that she would not seek re-election. She was succeeded by United Conservative Josephine Pon; the Alberta Party candidate took less than 9% of the votes.

Electoral history

2015 general election

Advocacy 
Bill 2, An Act to Remove Barriers for Survivors of Sexual and Domestic Violence, was introduced by NDP MLA Kathleen Ganley on March 7, 2017. If passed, Bill 2 would allow survivors of sexual assault and sexual misconduct who wish to sure their attackers to file civil claims at any point, removing the standard two-year deadline for civil actions.

In April 2017, during the Second Reading of Bill 2, Karen McPherson spoke publicly about her experience with sexual violence and spoke in support of Bill 2. This was the first time MLA McPherson spoke publicly about her lived experience with sexual violence.

References

1960s births
Alberta Party MLAs
Alberta New Democratic Party MLAs
Living people
Politicians from Calgary
Politicians from Edmonton
Women MLAs in Alberta
21st-century Canadian politicians
21st-century Canadian women politicians